A Portrait Painted by the Sun is the second studio album by Canadian atmospheric black metal band Finnr's Cane. It was released in 2013 by Prophecy Productions.

Like the band's debut album, Wanderlust, A Portrait Painted by the Sun was recorded by The Bard at Sardonic Moon Studio in Sudbury, Ontario, Canada, and the artwork and layout were handled by Benjamin König.

The cyclical nature of the seasons and the powerful sunshine of spring have been cited as thematic influences for the album. The digipak release features a two-panel photo of a piece of birch bark with etchings of the album's lyrics.

Track listing

Personnel
The Peasant
The Slave
The Bard

Other
 Benjamin König – paintings and layout
Dan and Alex – musical contributions

References

2013 albums
Finnr's Cane albums